Nasser Jumaa (Arabic:ناصر جمعة) (born 24 September 1988) is an Emirati footballer who played in the UAE First Division League as a defender.

References

External links
 

Emirati footballers
1988 births
Living people
Dibba FC players
Al-Arabi SC (UAE) players
Sharjah FC players
Al Hamriyah Club players
UAE First Division League players
UAE Pro League players
Association football defenders